The Tour of Faroe Islands is a road cycling race held in the Faroe Islands. The race consists of a men's, women's and juniors' competition over a prologue and four or five stages, which are for elite cyclists and shorter distances for non-elite cyclists. From 2011 to 2013, the race was changed to four stages in three days. The first edition of the Kring Føroyar tour was held in 1996 but it was not an official race; the 1997 Tour was the first official edition of the race. The race is normally held in July shortly before Ólavsøka. In 2012 the race was held from 20 July to 22 July. The last day of the race is held in Tórshavn, and the roads are closed for traffic on that day. In 2015 the race will be held from 22–26 July. For sponsor reasons the name of the tour was Statoil Kring Føroyar, and later when the Faroese company changed its name from Statoil to Effo, the tour was called Effo Kring Føroyar. In 2014 the race got a new main sponsor and the name was changed to Volvo Kring Føroyar.

The 2015 Tour of Faroe Islands started on 22 July in Tórshavn and ends also in Tórshavn five days later on 26 July. The route was as follows: Day 1: Tórshavn-Runavík (from Streymoy to Eysturoy), day 2: Klaksvík-Sornfelli (from Borðoy to a mountain on Streymoy), day 3: Sandur-around the island Sandoy-Sandur, day 4: Suðuroy, starting end ending at the Effo-station in Tvøroyri, the final day: starting and ending at Wenzel in Tórshavn. The road racers at the 2015 tour come from the Faroe Islands, Iceland and Denmark. The winner of stage 1, 2 and 3 of the 2015 tour was Torkil Veyhe, the winner of stage 4 was Dávur Magnussen, who also won the mountain jersey for stage 4 which was in Suðuroy. Torkil Veyhe won the 2015 Tour of Faroe Islands, it took him 12 hours 51 minutes to race the 460 km route, Guðmundur Joensen was runner-up and Bjarke Vodder Nielsen took bronze. Dávur Magnussen won the mountain-jersey.

Past winners

References

External links
 Official website of Tórshavnar Súkklufelag, the Cycling Club of Tórshavn

Men's road bicycle races
Cycle races in the Faroe Islands
Cycling in the Faroe Islands
Sport in Tórshavn
Summer events in the Faroe Islands